École polytechnique universitaire de Montpellier (Polytech Montpellier, formerly Institut des sciences de l'ingénieur de Montpellier) is a French engineering College created in 1969.

The school trains engineers in eight majors :

 Computer Science and Management
 Materials Science and Engineering
 Electrical Engineering
 Water Science and Engineering
 Energetic - Renewables Energies
 Food Science and Engineering
 Mechanical Engineering and Interaction
 Energectics and Renewable Energies

Located in Montpellier since 2012, Polytech Montpellier is a public higher education institution. The school is a member of the University of Montpellier.

Notable alumni 
 Soumaïla Cissé, a Malian politician who served in the government of Mali as Minister of Finance from 1993 to 2000

References

External links
 Polytech Montpellier

Engineering universities and colleges in France
Polytech Montpellier
Montpellier
Educational institutions established in 1969
1969 establishments in France